The 1972 Idaho Vandals football team represented the University of Idaho in the 1972 NCAA University Division football season. The Vandals were led by third-year head coach Don Robbins and were members of the Big Sky Conference. They played their home games at new Idaho Stadium, an unlit outdoor facility on campus in Moscow, Idaho.

Season
With quarterbacks Rick Seefried, Dave Comstock, and Ross Goddard running the offense, the Vandals were defending Big Sky champions.

In the Battle of the Palouse, Idaho suffered a fifth straight loss to neighbor Washington State of the Pac-8, falling  at the new Martin Stadium in Pullman on October 7.

In their second game with new rival Boise State, the Vandals won 22–21 in the rain at Bronco Stadium on November 25 to even up the series; Idaho did not schedule Northern Arizona until 1975 and played only five games in conference.

University division 
Through 1977, the Big Sky was a college division (renamed Division II in 1973) conference for football, except for university division (Division I) member Idaho, which moved down to the new Division I-AA in 1978. Idaho maintained its upper division status in the NCAA by playing university division non-conference opponents (and was ineligible for the college division postseason).

After the season in November, the Big Sky denied Idaho's request for additional football scholarships (75 vs. 62) for 1973.

Schedule

Roster

All-conference
The Vandal co-captains, center Ken Muhlbeier and linebacker Rand Marquess, were selected to the Big Sky all-conference team. Three Idaho players were named to the second team: running back Bernie Rembert, tight end Darrell Burchfeld, and defensive end

NFL Draft
One Vandal senior was selected in the 1973 NFL Draft, which lasted seventeen rounds (442 selections).

Two juniors were selected in the following year's draft in 1974, which lasted seventeen rounds (442 selections).

List of Idaho Vandals in the NFL Draft

References

External links
Gem of the Mountains: 1973 University of Idaho yearbook – 1972 football season
Go Mighty Vandals – 1972 – Idaho and the PCAA
Idaho Argonaut – student newspaper – 1972 editions

Idaho
Idaho Vandals football seasons
Idaho Vandals football